The 2023 protests in France are a series of general strikes and demonstrations organised in France since 19 January by opponents to a pension reform bill of the Borne government, which increased the retirement age from 62 to 64 years old. The strikes have led to widespread disruption, including garbage piling up in the streets and public transport cancelations. The government has used Article 49.3 of the constitution to force the bill through the French Parliament, sparking more protests and two failed no confidence votes.

Background 
The issue of pension reforms has been dealt with by various governments over recent decades, specifically to tackle budget shortfalls. France has one of the lowest retirement ages for an industrialised country, and spends more than most countries on pensions, it amounting to almost 14% of economic output. France's pension system is largely built on a "pay-as-you-go structure"; both workers and employers "are assessed mandatory payroll taxes that are used to fund retiree pensions". This system, "which has enabled generations to retire with a guaranteed, state-backed pension, will not change". Compared to other European countries, France possesses "one of the lowest rates of pensioners at risk of poverty", with a net pension replacement rate ("a measure of how effectively retirement income replaces prior earnings") of 74%, higher than OECD and EU averages. The New York Times says the government argues rising life expectancies "have left the system in an increasingly precarious state"; "[i]n 2000, there were 2.1 workers paying into the system for every one retiree; in 2020 that ratio had fallen to 1.7, and in 2070 it is expected to drop to 1.2, according to official projections". They add that in order "[t]o keep the system financially viable without funneling more taxpayer money into it — something the government already does — Macron sought to gradually raise the legal age when workers can start collecting a pension by three months every year until it reaches 64 in 2030." As well, Macron has "accelerated a previous change that increased the number of years that workers must pay into the system to get a full pension and abolished special pension ‌rules that benefited workers in sectors like energy and transportation".

As part of Macron's pension reforms, the retirement age was to be raised to 64 or 65, from 62. It was pointed out in December 2022 that the pay-as-you-go system - that raising the retirement age would help to further finance, as life expectancies increase and more start work later - would have a surplus of €3.2bn in 2022, but the government's pensions advisory board (COR) forecast that it would "fall into structural deficits in coming decades unless new financing sources are found". In March 2023, Labor Minister Olivier Dussopt said that "without immediate action" the pensions deficit would exceed $13bn annually by 2027. The government stated that the reforms would "balance the deficit" in 2030, with a surplus amounting to billions of dollars that would "pay for measures allowing those in physically demanding jobs to retire early".

The pension reforms have been long-considered by Macron and his government. Reforming the pension system was a significant part of his platform for election in 2017, with initial protests and transport strikes in late 2019, prior to the COVID-19 pandemic which saw Macron delay the reforms further. On 26 October 2022, Macron announced in a televised interview that pension reform scheduled for 2023 intended to raise the retirement age to 65, specifically that the minimum retirement age to be able to receive a full pension would be "gradually increased" from 62 to 65 by 2031, by three months per year from September 2023 to September 2030. Furthermore, the number of years that contributions would need to be made to qualify for the full state pension would increase from 42 to 43 in 2027, meaning that some may have to work to 67 - the year at which a person is automatically able to receive a state pension from. In addition to this, France's 42 separate pension schemes would be "streamlined". Macron clarified he would be willing to "discuss the retirement age with unions and make potential amendments", and that not implementing the reforms would lead to a reduction in the size of pensions.

Details of the reforms were scheduled to be revealed on 15 December 2022, but were delayed further to 10 January 2023, as a courtesy to the Greens and Republicans who were in the midst of electing new leaders; postponing the reforms to allow Macron to consult with said new leaders before revealing said details.

In his New Year's Eve speech on 31 December 2022, he clarified that they would be implemented by autumn 2023. In early January 2023 prior to consultation with unions, Prime Minister Elisabeth Borne spoke on FranceInfo radio, stating that the government could "show flexibility" on the intention to raise the retirement age to 65, and were willing to explore "other solutions" that would enable the government to "reach its target of balancing the pensions system by 2030". She announced that the policy would be presented to cabinet on January 23 and debated in parliament in early February, with full details published on January 10.

Use of Article 49.3

Motivations 
Polls have consistently shown that the measures are substantially unpopular, as well as the use of Article 49.3 to enact them without a parliamentary vote in the National Assembly. France 24 reported that a poll from a few days prior to the move suggested around "eight out of ten people opposed legislating in this way, including a majority of voters who backed Macron in the first round of last year's presidential election". Antoine Bristielle, a representative of the Fondation Jean-Jaures think tank, commented that using 49.3 is "perceived as a symbol of brutality" that could "erode support both for the government and democratic institutions".  Macron's approval ratings have deteriorated as a result.

It has been suggested that the reforms do not adequately tackle the disadvantage women are at within the workforce, who usually retire later than men and with pensions 40% lower in comparison, attributed to more part-time work and maternity leave. Women are already subject to later retirement due to taking time away from work to raise children. Euronews outlined that the reforms would lead to women retiring later and working, on average, seven months longer over the course of their life, while men would work around five months longer. They quoted Franck Riester, the Minister Delegate for Parliamentary Relations, admitting that women would be "a bit penalised by the reform" in January.

As well as this, it has been argued the reforms will hit the working-class and those who work in manual jobs disproportionately. CNN pointed out that blue-collar workers are likely to start working at a younger age than white-collar workers; The Washington Post pointed out that those employed in 'physically or mentally demanding' jobs are still eligible to retire earlier with a full pension, although The New York Times equally pointed to how this was a concession by the government to "mollify opposition", which overall has failed because unions view the increase in the retirement age as a "non-starter". At the other end of the scale, it has been reported that some are concerned about "being forced to retire later because older adults who want to work but who lose their jobs often face age discrimination in the labor market".

Those opposed to the reforms argue "the government is prioritising businesses and people who are highly paid over average laborers", and have "disputed the need for urgency", The New York Times saying they contest that "Macron is attacking a cherished right to retirement and unfairly burdening blue-collar workers because of his refusal to increase taxes on the wealthy". As well, opponents opine that Macron has "exaggerated the threat of projected deficits and refused to consider other ways to balance the system, like increasing worker payroll taxes, decoupling pensions from inflation or increasing taxes on wealthy households or companies", and that "the official body that monitors France's pension system has acknowledged that there is no immediate threat of bankruptcy and that long-term deficits", which Macron and the government have argued would occur if these reforms were not implemented, "were hard to accurately predict".

Jean Garrigues, a historian on France's political culture, theorised the unpopularity of the reforms can be partially attributed to Macron personally, given the "pre-existing anger against" him, having "struggled to shake off the image of an out-of-touch 'president of the rich'". He said that "[t]hat's why he has not only all the unions, but also a large part of public opinion against him", as "[b]y tying himself to the project, opposition to it is heightened, dramatized in a way."

It has been criticised for having taken place during a cost-of-living crisis, which some have attributed to worsening the anger and protests over the policies.

Timeline

19 January 
 
On 19 January, the Ministry of the Interior counted 1.12 million demonstrators, including 80,000 in Paris. Over 200 demonstrations were reported in the country.

More than one million people took to the streets in Paris and other French towns as part of countrywide protests over proposals to raise the retirement age. Eight of the largest unions participated in the strike over pension reforms. The French Ministry of the Interior said that 80,000 demonstrators gathered in the streets in Paris, where small numbers threw bottles, rocks, and fireworks at riot police. Over 200 demonstrations were reported in the country. According to the unions, 2 million people took part in the demonstrations with 400,000 of them participating in the Paris demonstrations.

Despite the demonstrations, Emmanuel Macron emphasized that the pension reforms would go forward. French unions declared that further strikes and protests would be held on 31 January in an effort to halt the government's plans to raise the standard retirement age from 62 to 64. The new law would increase annual pension contributions, from 41 to 43 payments throughout the year. Some flights out of Orly Airport were canceled, while the Eurostar website reported the cancellation of many routes between Paris and London. Though "a few delays" were reported at Charles de Gaulle Airport, owing to striking air traffic controllers, no flights were canceled.

21 January 

Another demonstration was organized in Paris on 21 January, supposedly long-planned by students and youth organisations.

Demonstrations organized by different groups took place in other cities, like in Dinan, Limoges and Lyon.

31 January 

Demonstrations were organized around the country with public transport, schools, and electricity production specifically targeted by the strikes. Public television broadcasters were also affected by the strikes, with news broadcasts cancelled and music played instead.

According to the CGT union, 2.8 million people took part in the protests while the Ministry of Internal Affairs counted 1.272 million protesters.

7 February
On 7 February, a third day of national protests were held after being called by l’intersyndicale. According to the CGT, 400,000 people demonstrated in Paris, down 100,000 from the 31 of January. In total, over 2,000,000 strikers participated in demonstrations according to the CGT, while the police estimate that around 757,000 strikers participated in protests.

11 February
On 11 February, a fourth day of national protests was held. According to the CGT, over 2,500,000 protestors took part in demonstrations, a rise of 500,000 compared to 7 February, while the Ministry of the Interior claims that 963,000 protested, a rise of over 200,000 compared to 7 February. In Paris, over 500,000 people demonstrated against the reform according to the CGT, while 93,000 demonstrated according to the prefecture. The Intersyndicale called for recurring strikes starting on 7 March.

16 February 
On 16 February, protesters joined fresh rallies and strikes. Unions said some 1.3 million people participated nationwide Thursday, the lowest figure since the protest movement started on January 19. The interior ministry put the national figure at 440,000, down from nearly a million on Saturday (11 Feb). On the day, 30 percent of flights from Paris's Orly airport were cancelled.

7 March 

In early March, trains around the country continued to be affected by strikes and protests. It is believed that 1.1 to 1.4 million people participated in over 260 protests across the country. As a part of the protest, union members blocked fuel deliveries from being made, with the intention of bringing the French economy to its knees.

11–12 March 
On Saturday, 11 March, the seventh day of protests was held in response to the National Assembly and Senate debating the draft law, with a final vote expected that month. Macron twice declined meetings with unions that week. About 368,000 people protested, below the 800,000–1,000,000 expected. The following day, the Senate passed an initial vote by 195–112.

15 March 

200 protests were reported to have taken place across the country. There were conflicting numbers of the strength of the protests; the Interior Ministry reported 480,000 marched throughout the country, with 37,000 in Paris, while CGT counted 1.78m and 450,000 respectively. Figures from Le Monde dispute both these claims. Reportedly, French police expected 650,000–850,000 protesters nationwide, fewer than the largest protests the previous week, with preliminary figures demonstrating a lower strike turnout in the energy and transport sectors at midday compared to previous days.

Among those who were on strike were train drivers, school teachers, dock workers, oil refinery workers, as well as garbage collectors continuing their now ten-day strike action.

In the afternoon, protesters gathered at the Esplanade des Invalides, with "loud music and huge union balloons". Police had ordered that the build-up of rubbish to be "cleared out along the march route" after some "used garbage to start fires or throw trash at police in recent demonstrations". The marchers were "accompanied by a heavy security force" as they "moved through the Left Bank along unencumbered streets". Police reported that one group of protestors "attacked a small business", and that nine people were detained within three hours of the march beginning. The protestors' march ended at the Place d'Italie. Known as "Greve 15 mars", it was co-ordinated and organised by eight trade unions.

Liquefied natural gas operations were suspended, with public transport severely affected; it was stated that 40% of high-speed trains and half the regional trains were cancelled, with the Paris Metro running slower. The DGAC warned of delays, reporting that 20% of the flights at Paris-Orly airport were cancelled.

Elsewhere, in Rennes, Nantes, and Lyon, "[s]ecurity forces countered violence with charges and tear gas", according to French media. Demonstrations also took place in Le Havre in Normandy, and Nice.

PBS reported that Interior Minister Gerald Darmanin had asked Paris City Hall to force some of the garbage workers to return to work, calling the build-up along the streets a "a public health issue". Paris mayor Anne Hidalgo said that she supported the strike, and in response a government spokesman Olivier Véran declared that if she did not comply, the Interior Ministry would be "ready to act instead".

16 March

Invoking of Article 49.3 
Protests erupted after the announcement that the pension reforms would be enacted without a parliamentary vote, Borne invoking article 49:3 of the constitution to do so just "minutes" before the scheduled vote on the bill. Inside the National Assembly, opposition MPs on the left booed and jeered the announcement and sang the national anthem in order to prevent Borne from speaking, forcing the session to be briefly suspended before the announcement by Borne was made. Speaking to MPs who were booing her, Borne proclaimed that "[w]e cannot gamble on the future of our pensions ... The reform is necessary."

Marine Le Pen announced she would file a no-confidence motion in the government, describing the use of Article 49.3 as "an extraordinary confession of weakness." Fabien Roussel stated that the left was ready to make the same motion; Socialist Party leader Olivier Faure "accused Macron of deploying a "permanent coup d'état" to shove through the legislation". The Week said that "Macron and his government insist the reforms are needed to keep the pension system solvent and government borrowing acceptably low".

Conservative MPs, such as those from Les Republicains, whom Macron has relied upon for support in votes in the National Assembly, "rebuke[d] the government, warning that its move would radicalise opponents and undercut the law's democratic legitimacy."

Reaction by protestors 
In the Place de la Concorde, thousands protested (figures are disputed between 2,000 protestors and 7,000). France 24 reported that it was a "spontaneous and unplanned rally", but Le Monde stated that it was "organized by the union Solidaires and authorized by the administrative court". La France Insoumise leader Jean-Luc Melenchon spoke to the crowd, declaring that Macron had gone "over the heads of the will of the people." He also claimed the reform had "no legitimacy – neither in parliament, nor in the street". It is possible that many joined the rally in Paris after being turned away by police from the "blockade of the Veolia warehouse in Aubervilliers". 

Later, a bonfire was lit, with police armed with shields and batons deploying tear gas in an attempt to clear the square at around 8pm. By "nightfall", 120 people were reported to have been arrested, according to Parisian police, "on suspicion of seeking to cause damage"; the number later rose to 217. Protestors in the Place were observed to have thrown cobbled stones at assembled police before they moved in to break up the groups, with smaller sections of protestors running down side streets and setting smaller fires, such as to piles of garbage. Numerous makeshift barricades in Paris streets were set alight. The CGT announced further strikes and demonstrations for 23 March; its head, Philippe Martinez, said that the forcing through of the law "shows contempt towards the people". France 24 commented that "unionists were also out in strength, hailing a moral victory even as they denounced Macron's "violation of democracy"".

Protests took place in other cities, such as Rennes, Nantes, Lyon, Toulouse, and Marseille. In the latter, shop windows and bank fronts were smashed, for which "radical leftist groups" were partially blamed, with shops looted. Protests in the former three cities were reported to have resulted in clashes between protestors and police, and in Lyon consisted of approximately "400 people gathered in front of administrative offices, calling for the president to resign". There had been a brief blockade of the National Library early in the day.

The following day, Interior Minister Gérald Darmanin told RTL radio that 310 had been arrested in relation to protest action nationwide, with 258 in Paris.

17 March 
Demonstrations once again took place at the Place de la Concorde, attended by several thousand people "with chants, dancing and a huge bonfire," protestors chanting "Tax the rich", before riot police intervened using tear gas to clear the square, after some "climbed scaffolding on a renovation site, arming themselves with wood", and "lobbed fireworks and paving stones at police in a standoff". On Twitter, a clip of protestors gathered at the Place chanting "we decapitated Louis XVI and we can start again, Macron" went viral, with protestors also, more generally, calling for Macron to resign. Notably, head of the 'moderate' CFDT union, Laurent Berger, said that a change in government or Prime Minister "will not put out this fire, only withdrawing the reform."

Additionally, Paris's Boulevard Périphérique was "disrupted at almost 200 points during peak rush hour" in the morning, by CGT activists. It was also reported that there was "escalated strikes" at refineries, with a blockade of an unspecified refinery in southern France having began earlier in the day. A CGT representative claimed that strikes would "force the shutdown" of TotalEnergies' Normandy refinery by the weekend, furthering the industrial action; a rolling strike was already in place there, with strikers continuing to deliver less fuel than normal from other sites. (DW reported on 18 March that CGT had already shut it down by Friday evening, however.) The CGT also announced an extension to picket lines at Electricite de France.

Smaller protests and rallies took place in Bordeaux, Toulouse, Toulon and Strasbourg. Specific methods of protest across France reported were street furniture being destroyed, bins set alight, and windows smashed. In Dijon, protestors burned effigies of Macron.

Earlier in the day, police pepper-sprayed students protesting near Sorbonne University, with some also walking out of lectures. Sky News claimed protestors blocked traffic, with bin preventions stopped, but did not provide details as to where. In Donges, a roadblock was in place near to the TotalEnergie refinery oil terminals. Unions from SNCF, the national train operator, "urged workers to continue another continuous strike".

Broadcaster BFMTV reported that police detained 61 people following the protests. 36 were arrested in Lyon.

A multi-party no-confidence motion was tabled in the National Assembly earlier in the day. Spearheaded by centrist group Liot, it was co-signed by NUPES, with a total of 91 MPs from five different parliamentary groups signing. Later in the day, National Rally filed a separate no-confidence motion, signed by 81 cross-party MPs; party leader Le Pen said the decision to push through the pension changes was "a total failure for the government".

18 March 
On 18 March, it was announced protests in Paris were banned on the Place de la Concorde, opposite parliament, as well at the Champs-Élysées. Police explained this was due to "serious risks of disturbances to public order and security", and said those who did not obey this order could be fined. Despite this, widespread protests were still reported in Paris, with a rally instead planned for Place d'Italie in southern Paris at 6pm that evening, at which demonstrators chanted, once again, for Macron to resign, and "Macron is going to break down, we are going to win". 4,000 were present. Barricades were erected in the streets, rubbish bins were set alight, with the glass on billboards and bus shelters smashed. Barriers used to block the streets and bottles were thrown at riot police, who utilised tear gas and water cannons to disperse protestors. 81 arrests were made in the vicinity. Politico, quoting the Ministry of the Interior, later reported 122 had been arrested in Paris, with a total of 169 nationwide.

Police also used tear gas against protestors who started a fire in Bordeaux, as BFMTV showed demonstrations in major cities such as Marseille, Compiegne, Nantes (where around a thousand protested), Brest, and Montpellier, with around 200 protesting in Lodeve in the south of France. In Nice, the political office of the leader of the Republicans, Eric Ciotti, was ransacked, with tags left that threatened riots if the party refused to support any of the motions of no-confidence in the government. In the afternoon in Nantes, protestors threw bottles at police, who also responded with tear gas; in spite of this, DW described the protests in Nantes, as well as Marseille and Montpellier, as "mostly peaceful marches". In Lyon, some demonstrators tried to break into a town hall and set it alight, with police arresting 36; police claimed that ""groups of violent individuals" triggered clashes".

A spokesperson for TotalEnergies reported that 37% of its operational staff at refineries and depots, such as at Feyzin and Normandy, were on strike. Rolling strikes also continued on railways. Students and activists from the Permanent Revolution collective "briefly invaded" the Forum des Halles shopping mall, with banners calling for a general strike and chanting for Paris to "stand up" and "rise up", and letting off red smoke canisters. A representative of a union representing waste collectors said strikers at three incinerators outside of Paris would allow some trucks through to "limit the risk of an epidemic",, while police claimed trucks from five depots had restarted work. CGT announced "strikers were halting production at two refineries over the weekend". 

CGT announced the shutdown of France's largest refinery, TotalEnergies' Gonfreville-L’Orcher (Seine-Maritime) site.

19 March 

"Hundreds" of protestors were reported in Paris, Lyon, Marseille, and Lille in the evening. In Marseille, a large bonfire was lit, with a large throng of demonstrators dancing around it.

Some neighbourhoods of Paris continued to have collection of rubbish disrupted; Philippe Martinez from CGT "urged" Paris collection workers to continue their now-two-week-long strike. A few hundred people protested outside the Les Halles shopping centre before police moved them on. Early on Sunday, "dozens" of union activists marched through a shopping mall in Rosny-sous-Bois, and cars were allowed to pass through the tolls on the A1 and A13 motorways for free during the day. Shutdowns of refineries continued, with reports of petrol queues building up in the south of France; authorities claimed that "supplies were high enough to avoid shortages".

In response to reports of constituency offices of various MPs being vandalised, Macron "called the speakers of both houses of parliament to affirm his support for all legislators and said the government was mobilized to "put everything in place to protect them" late on 19 March.

20 March

Morning and afternoon 
DW reported, on 18 March, that union leaders were anticipating that some airports would see nearly a third of flights cancelled on 20 March, owing to strike action. easyJet and Ryanair, both British airlines, warned passengers to expect disruption. Ryanair said it was "expecting possible cancellations and delays on flights to and from France from 20 to 23 March." Eurostar announced that trains would run a normal service on 20 and 21 March, but there would be disruption to public transport in Lille on 20 March.

In the morning, rubbish piles were set alight around the ring road in Rennes as part of a road blockade, with protestors also blockading waste collection points and the nearby Vern-sur-Seiche oil depot was blockaded. The road blockade was attended by a "few hundred people". It began at 6:30am, and led to "over 15 miles of halted traffic around the city". Police used tear gas and charged towards protestors who were on the road and in surrounding fields. Shortly before midday, it was announced they had all been lifted. However, a damaged road in Porte de Saint-Malo meant the speed limit was temporarily reduced to 70 kilometres per hour. Crisis24 said that industrial action at oil refineries was "starting to impact fuel supplies", with shortages of fuel at stations, "particularly" in Marseille and the south of the country. Sky News, on 17 March, stated that garbage collection strikes are set to continue until at least 20 March.

SNCF has warned of "disruption to intercity and regional train services", with only two out of three trains running on several lines of Paris' RATP network. Crisis24 reported that such disruptions will continue until 23 March, when the national strike will exacerbate service provision.

On 17 March, teachers' unions called for strikes in the following weeks, possibly disrupting the baccalauréat exams, which begin on 20 March. CFDT's Laurent Berger proclaimed that she wished for no disruption to the exams as they could just worsen the already-high stress levels of the students taking them.

No-confidence vote 
It was confirmed on 18 March that the two no-confidence motions filed against the government will be debated beginning Monday, 20 March. The Republicans' leader has announced his intention not to support either motion, but The Times has reported some LR MPs may defy him.

A poll found that over two-thirds of the French public wanted the no-confidence vote to succeed - despite the likelihood of it doing so being slim - and for Prime Minister Borne to resign regardless of its success or not.

The debate began at 4pm in the National Assembly, with opposition MPs "booing and jeering [the Prime Minister] when she took to the podium". She commented that the government "has never gone so far to form a compromise" to pass the pension reform laws. Both motions of no-confidence failed. The trans-partisan vote of no confidence failed by nine votes.

Journalist Benjamin Dodman claimed that Borne et al. would use, and "spin", the success in the no-confidence motions as a measure of how "democratically legitimate" the pension reforms measures are.

France 24 reported that NUPES MPs did not expect the transpartisan no-confidence vote they were part of to be so close. Some MPs on the left held up paper reading "On continue" ("We will continue") during the proclamation of the results. Prime Minister Borne tweeted that "We are coming to the end of the democratic process of this essential reform for our country. I assumed my responsibility and that of my government with humility and seriousness." She visited the Élysée presidential palace a short time after the government won the non-confidence votes. France 24 revealed that Macron was to meet Prime Minister Borne in the morning of 21 March, the speaker of the National Assembly and the head of the senate over lunch, and with MPs from his Renaissance bloc in the evening. They reported some opposition MPs were "exploring legal avenues to challenge the law before the Constitutional Council, which must rule on the constitutionality of the reforms before they can be implemented", and that Melenchon "has called on people to "express themselves everywhere and in all circumstances to force the withdrawal of the pension reform"."

Aftermath; evening 
Spontaneous protests erupted throughout Paris. In the afternoon, those on the streets reacted to the results of the vote by chanting "Macron démission" ("Macron step down"). In the evening, in Place Vauban, protesters gathered, chanting "Macron resign!" and "Aux armes" (Take up arms), with police "push[ing] them back and blocked access to the square". Barricades were erected along the Rue de Rivoli.

Further action 
On 20 March, The Independent said that protests would continue until at least 6am on 23 March. However, Euronews reported that trade unions have "called for spontaneous demonstrations, culminating in a new day of strikes and protests, scheduled for Thursday, 23 March", the ninth day of nationwide industrial action since the pension reform strikes began. The largest protest is expected to be in Paris, with demonstrators assembling in the Place de la Bastille from 2pm.

Reuters reported a new general strike was also scheduled for the following Thursday, 30 March.

General impact

Concerns over increasing violence 
Multiple outlets, including media and unions, have grown concern over the increasing use of violence in the protests, particularly in the days since the government invoked Article 49.3, with comparisons made to the Gilets jaunes (Yellow Vests) protests of the first years of Macron's presidency. On 19 March, The Guardian commented that as "police brace[d] for a week of unpredictable, spontaneous protests in cities and small towns across France, the mood of anger was likened to the start of the gilets jaunes protests". 

France 24 commented that unions had been "united in coordinating their protests", but that "many expressed fears they could lose control of the protests as more radical demonstrators set the tone". Fabrice Coudour, a leading representative for the 'hard-left' CGT, commented that "tougher action ahead, more serious and further-reaching" was possible that could "escape our collective decision-making". Jean-Marie Pernot, a political scientist specialising in trade unions, said that a lack of "respect [for] any of the channels meant for the expression of dissent, it will find a way to express itself directly". One of the Yellow Vests' "prominent spokesmen", Jerome Rodrigues, spoke to protestors outside the National Assembly after the invoking of Article 49.3 on 17 March, that "the objective was now nothing less than "the defeat" of the president."

Head of the UNSA trade union federation, Lauren Escure, admitted that "when there is this much anger and so many French people on the streets, the more radical elements take the floor", and that it was not something they would want, but was inevitable, and "will be entirely the government's fault," he told AFP. The heads of two 'moderate' unions, Cyril Chabanier of CFTC and Laurent Berger of CFDT, expressed that unions were concerned. Cabanier said that an impression that "it is just violence that pays" was being created, and that "[t]here are some people who are very angry, [and] the anger leads to greater radicalisation and radicalisation unfortunately leads to violence". Berger has been reported as having warned the government that protests could grow more violent if those protesting begin to feel that the Yellow Vests, in France 24s words, "achieved more with violence than established unions with their peaceful, mass demonstrations".

On 19 March, The Guardian reported that - alongside the leader of the Republicans' office being vandalised - other MPs from the party were "receiving hundreds of threatening emails a day". Frédérique Meunier told BFMTV that "[i]t's as if tomorrow they want to decapitate us", and that the emails being received "amounted to harassment". The constituency offices of Renaissance MPs - the party from which Macron originates - were also targeted.

Waste collection strike 

A strike by waste collectors began on 6 March, which included a blockade of the city's incinerators. Originally set to last nine days, it was extended by another five on 15 March. As of 15 March, "bin lorries [were] grounded at depots and at least three waste incinerators in the Paris area [were] at a standstill".

The impact of the waste workers strike has left thousands of tonnes of rubbish uncollected on the streets of Paris. On 17 March, it was estimated the amount was 10,000 tonnes, up from 7,600 earlier in the week. Interior Minister Gerald Darmanin said that "strikers were being forced back under emergency powers designed to safeguard essential services", and from the morning of 17 March told RTL radio that "requisitioning is working and bins are being emptied", although this was disputed by an aide of Paris mayor Anne Hidalgo. Hidalgo has maintained her support for the strikers despite efforts by government to break it, with the deputy mayor in charge of waste, Colombe Brossel, commenting that "any demand to force strikers back to work would be "an attack on the constitutional right to strike"."

Paris' municipal waste collectors started its strike and blockade of the city's incinerators twelve days earlier; the proposed pension reforms would raise their retirement age from 57 to 59. Waste collection in Paris is split around half-and-half between them and private companies, who remained in operation with some taking contracts to operate in areas worst hit by the strike action; such as the ninth district, whose mayor, Delphine Burkli, suggested "calling in the army to clear the streets."

Waste collection strikes also affected Antibes, Rennes and Le Havre.

As of 19 March, Philippe Martinez from CGT had "urged" Paris collection workers to continue their now-two-week-long strike.

Political ramifications 
Macron's proposal to raise the retirement age from 62 to 64 has been compared to former President Nicholas Sarkozy's 2010 reform that raised the retirement age from 60 to 62, which also led to massive strikes and protests across France. Public opinion polling analysis has shown that Sarkozy's push for reform played a role in driving voters to both the Socialist Party and the far-right National Front in the 2012 presidential election.
 
One author of a paper in academic journal West European Politics tweeted a screenshot of the results of a study that showed executive approval has historically fallen after no-confidence votes, and linked it to what the impact of invoking Article 49.3 could be. The Guardian touched on political dissatisfaction, comparing the protests to that of the gilet jaunes, which "were initially against fuel tax rises but evolved to encompass a wider lack of trust in the political system". Antoine Bristielle, from the Fondation Jean-Jaures think tank, opined that the invoking of Article 49.3 could be "perceived as a symbol of brutality" and could "erode support both for the government and democratic institutions".

See also 
 1995 strikes in France
 2010 French pension reform strikes
 2019–2020 French pension reform strike
 2022 French protests
 Protests against Emmanuel Macron
 Yellow vests protests

References

2023 protests
2023 labor disputes and strikes
2023 protests
Pension reform strikes
Pension reform strikes
Pension reform strikes
Anti-austerity protests in the European Union
Contemporary French history
Labor disputes in France
Pensions in France
Pension reform strikes
Reform in France
Riots and civil disorder in France
Far-left politics in France
Emmanuel Macron